The Istanbul Women's Volleyball Championship (Turkish: İstanbul Kadınlar Voleybol Şampiyonası) is a defunct volleyball league competition of the volleyball teams from Istanbul in Turkey, run by the Turkish Volleyball Federation from 1955 to 1984.

Champions

All champions

References
 Somalı, Vala. "Türk-Dünya Voleybol Tarihi: 1895–1986", İstanbul (1986).
 Dağlaroğlu, Rüştü. "Fenerbahçe Spor Kulübü Tarihi 1907–1987", İstanbul (1988).
 Atabeyoğlu, Cem. "Türk Spor Tarihi Ansiklopedisi", İstanbul (1991).

Volleyball leagues in Turkey
Turkey
Defunct sports leagues in Turkey
1955 establishments in Turkey
1984 disestablishments in Turkey
Women's volleyball in Turkey
Turkey
Volleyball